Stephano Alves de Almeida (born 17 September 1993), known as Stephano Almeida, is a Brazilian professional footballer who currently plays for FC ViOn Zlaté Moravce as a right-back.

References

External links
 FC ViOn Zlaté Moravce official club profile 
 
 Futbalnet profile 
 

1993 births
Living people
Sportspeople from São Paulo
Brazilian footballers
Brazilian expatriate footballers
Association football defenders
FC Silon Táborsko players
FC ViOn Zlaté Moravce players
Slovak Super Liga players
Expatriate footballers in Portugal
Expatriate footballers in the Czech Republic
Expatriate footballers in Slovakia
Brazilian expatriate sportspeople in Portugal
Brazilian expatriate sportspeople in the Czech Republic
Brazilian expatriate sportspeople in Slovakia